Luke Humphries (born 11 February 1995) is an English professional darts player who plays in Professional Darts Corporation (PDC) events. Nicknamed "Cool Hand Luke", he is the current World No. 6. He won the 2019 PDC World Youth Championship.

Career

Humphries won five PDC Development Tour titles in 2017, finishing top of the Development Tour Order of Merit. As a result of this, he qualified for the 2018 PDC World Darts Championship where he lost to Jeff Smith, and received a PDC Tour Card for the 2018 and 2019 season.

2019
He also won the Development Tour Order of Merit in 2019, a year which culminated in a fantastic run at the 2019 World Championship for Humphries. He beat Adam Hunt, Stephen Bunting, Dimitri Van den Bergh, and defending champion Rob Cross, before eventually losing 1–5 to Michael Smith in the quarter-finals.

Following Gary Anderson's withdrawal from the 2019 Premier League, Humphries was selected as one of nine 'contenders' to replace him. He played a one-off match against Gerwyn Price on night four in Exeter.

At the age of 24 Humphries won the 2019 PDC World Youth Championship, where he beat Adam Gawlas 6–0, becoming the oldest player to do so in its history.

2020
In the 2020 World Championship, Humphries once again reached the quarter-finals, before losing 5–3 to eventual champion Peter Wright. Humphries was once again selected for the Premier League, this time under the tag of 'challenger'. He faced Gary Anderson in Exeter and became the first challenger to win their game.

2021
In the 2021 World Championship, Humphries suffered a shock 3–2 first round defeat to veteran Paul Lim.
Luke Humphries made his first major televised final at the 2021 UK Open in March 2021. His run to the final saw him claim wins over Dave Chisnall in the quarter-final and then-reigning champion Michael van Gerwen in the semi-final. He was defeated 11–5 by James Wade in the final.

2022
In the 2022 World Championship, Humphries reached his third quarter-final in four years  before losing 5–2 to Gary Anderson.
Humphries reached his first PDC European Tour final at the 2022 German Darts Grand Prix by beating Jeffrey de Zwaan, Michael Smith, Wesley Plaisier and Michael van Gerwen. He beat Martin Lukeman in the final, hitting double 4 to win 8–2.

2023
In the 2023 World Championship, Humphries reached the fourth round before losing 4–1 to Stephen Bunting.

Personal life

On 10 October 2022, Humphries announced via his Twitter that his partner had given birth to a baby boy, weighing .

World Championship results

PDC
 2018: Preliminary round (lost to Jeff Smith 0–2)
 2019: Quarter-finals (lost to Michael Smith 1–5)
 2020: Quarter-finals (lost to Peter Wright 3–5)
 2021: First round (lost to Paul Lim 2–3)
 2022: Quarter-finals (lost to Gary Anderson 2–5)
 2023: Fourth round (lost to Stephen Bunting 1–4)

Performance timeline
PDC

PDC European Tour

PDC career finals

PDC major finals: 1 (1 runner-up)

Notes

References

External links 
 

{{#ifexpr:<21|}}

1995 births
Living people
English darts players
Professional Darts Corporation current tour card holders
People from Newbury, Berkshire
PDC world youth champions